Stanly Teixeira dos Santos (born 23 April 1994), known as Stanly, is a Brazilian football player.

Club career
He made his professional debut in the Segunda Liga for Trofense on 1 February 2015 in a game against Tondela.

References

External links

1994 births
Sportspeople from Bahia
Living people
Brazilian footballers
Brazilian expatriate footballers
Associação Atlética Portuguesa (Santos) players
São Paulo FC players
Anadia F.C. players
S.C. Salgueiros players
AD Oliveirense players
C.D. Trofense players
Desportivo Brasil players
Liga Portugal 2 players
Association football forwards
Brazilian expatriate sportspeople in Portugal
Expatriate footballers in Portugal